Kovojab (Kovojap, Kvolyab, Kopoyap) is a Bayono–Awbono language spoken in the highlands of Papua Province, Indonesia.

All that is known of Kovojab is a few hundred words recorded in Wilbrink (2004). The Kovojab word list in Wilbrink (2004) was originally recorded by Peter Jan de Vries.

Names
Ethnologue gives the name Kvolyab as an alternative name for Awbono. However, Glottolog classifies Kovojab with Bayono rather than with Awbono.

The name Kopoyap is given by Hischier (2006).

References

Bayono–Awbono languages